David Prentiss may refer to:

David Prentiss (Mayor/President), fictional character in the Chaos Walking trilogy
Davy Prentiss, Jr., fictional character in the Chaos Walking trilogy
David Prentiss (filmmaker), writer of Dr. Terror's Gallery of Horrors

See also
David Prentis, General Secretary of UNISON
David Prentice (disambiguation)